USS Rockport may refer to the following ships operated by the United States Navy:

 once bore the name Rockport during her 65-year career. She was a screw steamer serving from 1876 to 1940
 a wooden scientific research vessel originally named Ajax. Serving from 1917 to 1919

United States Navy ship names